The Eclipse Machine Company was an American bicycle and aircraft component manufacturer.

History 
The Steel Pulley & Machine Company was founded in 1883 in Indianapolis, Indiana by Harmon H. Fulton. It moved to Beaver Falls, Pennsylvania in 1892 and again in 1895 to Elmira, New York. Then, in 1914, the company started manufacturing automobile starter motors under license from the Bendix Corporation and in 1929 was acquired by Bendix outright. By 1939, the company had been combined with Pioneer Instrument Company under a new roof at a factory in Teterboro, New Jersey. During World War II, the company built timed anti-aircraft fuses and 20 mm aircraft cannon. It was the latter that spurred the construction of a second plant in 1940.

References 

Aerospace companies of the United States
Aircraft component manufacturers of the United States
American companies established in 1883
Cycle manufacturers of the United States
Manufacturing companies based in New York (state)
Bendix Corporation